Kürnach is a municipality in the district of Würzburg in Bavaria in Germany. The distance from Kürnach to the state capital of Bavaria München is about 221 km (137.6 miles).

Population 
Population of the municipality increased from 1904 to 2015.

Gallery

St Michael's Parish Church

References 

Würzburg (district)